Habib Belkziz (Arabic حبيب بلقزيز, Marrakech, 9 November 1989) is a Moroccan gnawa singer, songwriter, and multi-instrumentalist. He released the Album Sidi Kmmy produced by HaBiBelk Productions Records.

Career

Beginnings
Habib Belkziz started singing at eight years old and made his first appearances since the age of nine in family weddings. In his childhood he was often invited to the Gnawa evening gatherings "LILA" with his uncle "Maàllam Abdelkbir Merchan" in Marrakech. His interest was quickly aroused in the Gnawa Spiritual Music. His uncle recognized his passion for music and gave him his first little Guimbri that he called "Awicha". Over the years, Habib gained more experience through many appearances at festivals, weddings, hotels, riads, traditional restaurants as a solo entertainer but also as a member of multiple groups in Morocco and Europe. He became active in 2005 under the name Habibelk.

Later on, Habib moved from Morocco to Germany and released his first video in his YouTube channel that was established back in 2006.

On 15 March 2017, Habib released his first videos Hammadi then Mberika and Baba Mimoun that are all part of the album Sidi kmmy.
In 2018, he co-produced the song "Al Ayta" with the Egyptian artist Hamza Namira. The song was on the top 10 ranking of the Moroccan Radio channel Hit Radio.

In 2019, Habib Belk produced the song Sandiya with new melodies and a different way of singing, arranging and mixing. Habibelk is known by innovating and mixing the Moroccan traditional Gnawa music with other genres including Trap, Bass, Reggaeton, Electro as well as R&B in an attempt to open up this music from a local perspective to a more global one.

Gnawa Deutschland 
In 2017, Habibelk founded the group Gnawa Deutschland together with three other artists: Rachid Lamouri from Berlin, Zakaria Izoubaz from Weinheim and Rabiie Rezgaoui from Bad Salzuflen (all Karkabou, dance and singing). The group tours and participates in various festivals and concerts in Europe and offers special Workshops in universities and schools in Germany.

Discography

Sidi Kmmy album 
 Hammadi – 2017
 Mberika – 2017
 Lalla Malika – 2017
 Baba Mimoun – 2017
 El Hadia – 2017
 La ilaha ila llah – 2018
 Goumari – 2018
 Youbati – 2018
 Sidi Kmmy – 2018

Music videos 
 Baba Mimoun – 2017
 Sidi Kmmy – 2018
 Sandiya – 2019
 Aicha - 2020
 Bouhali - 2020
Sinama - 2021
Amina - 2021
Lala Mira - 2022

Collaborations 
 Remix with Hamza Namira – Al Ayta – 2018
 Goumari - 2019: D33pSoul & Habib Belk
Mimouna - 2020: D33pSoul & Habib Belk
Sandiya - 2021: Dj Van & Habib Belk

References

External links
 Habib ́s channel on YouTube.
 Habibelk Facebook Page
 Gnawa Deutschland Facebook Page

1989 births
Living people
21st-century Moroccan male singers
Moroccan songwriters